Robert David Haas (born October 19, 1965) is a former Major League Baseball pitcher. He pitched parts of three seasons in the majors, from  until , for the Detroit Tigers. On April 14, 1991, Haas pitched a no-hitter while playing for Lakeland in the minors.

Haas attended Wichita State University, and in 1986 he played collegiate summer baseball with the Harwich Mariners of the Cape Cod Baseball League. He was selected by the Tigers in the 15th round of the 1988 MLB Draft.

References

Sources

1965 births
Abilene Prairie Dogs players
American expatriate baseball players in Canada
Baseball players from Missouri
Detroit Tigers players
Fayetteville Generals players
Harwich Mariners players
Jackson Generals (Texas League) players
Lakeland Tigers players
Living people
London Tigers players
Major League Baseball pitchers
Orlando Cubs players
Salinas Peppers players
Sportspeople from Independence, Missouri
Taichung Agan players
Taipei Gida players
Toledo Mud Hens players
Wichita State Shockers baseball players
American expatriate baseball players in Taiwan
Anchorage Glacier Pilots players